Marcel Kalz (born 9 March 1987) is a German former road and track cyclist.

Major results

Track

2004
 1st  Points race, National Junior Championships
2005
 1st  Madison, National Junior Championships (with Norman Dimde)
 2nd  Madison, UCI Junior World Championships
2006
 3rd  Madison, UEC European Under-23 Track Championships
2007
 1st  Madison (with Erik Mohs), UEC European Under-23 Track Championships
 1st  Madison, National Championships (with Robert Bengsch)
2008
 1st  Madison, National Championships (with Robert Bengsch)
2011
 1st  Madison, National Championships (with Robert Bengsch)
2012
 1st  Madison, National Championships (with Robert Bengsch)
2013
 1st Six Days of Bremen (with Franco Marvulli)
 1st  Points race, National Championships
2014
 1st Six Days of Copenhagen (with Robert Bartko)
 1st  Madison, National Championships (with Leif Lampater)
 2nd Six Days of Bremen (with Robert Bartko)
2015
 1st Six Days of Berlin (with Leif Lampater)
 1st Six Days of Bremen (with Alex Rasmussen)
 1st  Points race, National Championships
2017
 1st Six Days of Bremen (with Iljo Keisse)

Road
2011
 1st Stage 1 Bałtyk–Karkonosze Tour
2013
 1st Harlem Skyscraper Classic
2015
 3rd Madeira Criterium
2016
 1st Harlem Skyscraper Classic

References

External links
 

1987 births
Living people
German male cyclists
Cyclists from Berlin
German track cyclists